Phantom Killer is a 1942 American romantic mystery film directed by William Beaudine, and starring Dick Purcell, Joan Woodbury and John Hamilton. The film was a remake of Phil Rosen's The Sphinx.

Plot
A series of murders seems to implicate a deaf-mute philanthropist, except he has ironclad alibis for all of them.  Besides, he has spoken to at least one man who was nearby when the latest killing occurs.

Cast
Dick Purcell as Edward Clark
Joan Woodbury as Barbara Mason
John Hamilton as John G. Harrison
Warren Hymer as Police Sgt. Pete Corrigan
Mantan Moreland as Nicodemus 
J. Farrell MacDonald as Police Captain
Gayne Whitman as District Attorney John W. Rogers
Kenneth Harlan 	as Police Lt. Jim Brady
George J. Lewis as Kramer 
Karl Hackett as Defense Attorney
Harry Depp as Lester P. Cutler
Isabel La Mal as Mable
Robert Carson as Dave Rigby
Frank Ellis as Kelsey

References

External links
 

1942 films
1942 mystery films
1942 romantic drama films
American black-and-white films
Films directed by William Beaudine
Monogram Pictures films
American mystery films
American romantic drama films
Films about deaf people
1940s American films